Chammanad Devi Temple is a temple located 200 metres from the National Highway, between Vyttila and the town of Cherthala (16 km from each place). The 10-day festival Utsavam is celebrated in Kumbha Maasam. In front of this temple there is a big play ground and E.C.E.K Union High School.

There are two sub temples:

Shasta Temple - Near the E.C.E.K. Union High School.
Sri Krshna Temple - Located around 700 metres towards Eramalloor, at a place called Kannukulangara.

The temple belongs to a resident family known as the "Ettu veettil kartha family", which is functionally now eight families and their sub-families only, along with their recommended members run the temple.

Hindu temples in Alappuzha district
Devi temples in Kerala